Daniel Bennett Palka (born October 28, 1991) is an American professional baseball outfielder in the Boston Red Sox organization. He has played in Major League Baseball (MLB) for the Chicago White Sox and in the KBO League for the Samsung Lions.

Career

Amateur
Palka attended Greer High School in Greer, South Carolina. He was drafted by the Philadelphia Phillies in the 19th round of the 2010 Major League Baseball Draft. He did not sign with the Phillies and attended Georgia Tech, where he played college baseball. In 2011 and 2012, he played collegiate summer baseball with the Wareham Gatemen of the Cape Cod Baseball League, where he was the West division MVP of the league's all-star game in 2012. Palka’s junior year finished with him being Georgia Tech’s first position player All American since Matt Wieters. After his junior year, he was drafted by the Arizona Diamondbacks in the third round of the 2013 MLB Draft.

Arizona Diamondbacks
Palka made his professional debut with the Missoula Osprey and was later promoted to the Hillsboro Hops. He played for the South Bend Silver Hawks in 2014 and the Visalia Rawhide in 2015. After the 2015 season he played in the Arizona Fall League.

Minnesota Twins

On November 10, 2015, Palka was traded from the Diamondbacks to the Minnesota Twins for Chris Herrmann. He started 2016 with the Chattanooga Lookouts and was promoted to the Rochester Red Wings in July. Palka finished 2016 with a combined .254 batting average, 34 home runs and 90 RBI's between both clubs. The Twins added him to their 40-man roster after the season. In 2017, he played for Rochester, posting a .274 batting average with 11 home runs and 42 RBIs in 84 games.

Chicago White Sox
He was claimed off waivers by the Chicago White Sox on November 3, 2017. Palka was called up to the Major Leagues on April 24, 2018, and made his major league debut the next day. Palka led the 2018 Chicago White Sox with 27 home runs and finished fifth in AL Rookie of the Year voting. He began the following season on a 0-32 slump before snapping it on April 17, 2019. He was sent down to the Triple-A Charlotte Knights the following day. He was named International League Player of the Week from May 13-20. For the rest of the season, he led the Knights with 27 home runs. 

On November 21, 2019, Palka was designated for assignment by the White Sox. He was outrighted to AAA on November 25.

Samsung Lions
On July 29, 2020, Palka left the White Sox organization to sign with the Samsung Lions of the KBO League. In 51 games for Samsung, Palka slashed .209/.272/.367 with 8 home runs and 23 RBI. He became a free agent following the season.

Washington Nationals
On April 16, 2021, Palka signed a minor league contract with the Washington Nationals organization. Palka spent the 2021 season with the Triple-A Rochester Red Wings. He played in 106 games, hitting .256 with 18 home runs and 58 RBI's. Palka became a free agent following the season.

New York Mets
On December 13, 2021, Palka signed a minor league contract with the New York Mets. He was assigned to the Triple-A Syracuse Mets to begin the 2022 season. Palka appeared in 109 games for Syracuse, slashing .263/.344/.506 with 26 home runs and 79 RBI. He elected free agency on November 10, 2022.

Boston Red Sox
On February 24, 2023, Palka signed a minor league contract with the Boston Red Sox organization.

See also
2013 College Baseball All-America Team

References

External links

Georgia Tech Yellow Jackets bio 

1991 births
Living people
Sportspeople from Greenville, South Carolina
Baseball players from South Carolina
Major League Baseball outfielders
Chicago White Sox players
Georgia Tech Yellow Jackets baseball players
Wareham Gatemen players
Hillsboro Hops players
Missoula Osprey players
South Bend Silver Hawks players
Visalia Rawhide players
Salt River Rafters players
Rochester Red Wings players
Chattanooga Lookouts players
Gulf Coast Twins players
Navegantes del Magallanes players
American expatriate baseball players in Venezuela
Charlotte Knights players
American expatriate baseball players in South Korea
Samsung Lions players
Cangrejeros de Santurce (baseball) players
Syracuse Mets players
Leones del Escogido players
American expatriate baseball players in the Dominican Republic